Robert LeRoy Diamond (August 23, 1943May 15, 2019) was an American actor active in the 1950s and 1960s before retiring from the profession and becoming a lawyer. He is best known as the child lead in the television series Fury.

Early life and child roles
Diamond was born to a Jewish family in Los Angeles in 1943. His mother pushed him and his brother Gary into show business, and he appeared in small roles in a series of films in the early 1950s, beginning with a bit part in The Greatest Show on Earth in 1952. In 1955 he was cast as Joey Newton, an orphan who is taken in by rancher Jim Newton (played by Peter Graves), who introduces him to a horse named Fury, after whom the series was named. The show, broadcast on NBC, ran until 1960.

After Fury ended, Diamond had roles in a variety of other TV productions, such as a guest appearance in 1965 as Evan Hendricks on The Andy Griffith Show, and a recurring role in the final season of The Many Loves of Dobie Gillis as Dobie's cousin "Dunky". He was offered the role of the middle son in My Three Sons, but turned it down in favor of working on Westinghouse Playhouse, a starring vehicle for Nanette Fabray, which lasted only a single season against the other show's twelve. He was also considered for the role of Robin in the Batman TV series, but at 21 was thought to be too old, and lost the role to Burt Ward.

He had a single starring film role, as a boyish recruit in 1962's Airborne. Though the movie was well-received, his film career as an adult failed to take off, and his only other notable film roles were small parts in Billie (a 1965 Patty Duke comedy) and Scream (a 1981 slasher film).

Later life
Diamond attended San Fernando Valley State College, where in addition to studying broadcast journalism, he competed in gymnastics on the rings. Later, to avoid the Vietnam War draft, he studied law at San Fernando Valley College of Law, graduating in 1970 and starting a law practice in the area. Among his clients were Kelsey Grammer and Paul Petersen.

Personal life
In 1986, he married Tara Parker, whom he had met at a gym; they had two children, but were subsequently divorced.

Diamond died of cancer at Los Robles Regional Medical Center, Thousand Oaks, California, aged 75, in 2019.

References

External links 
 

1943 births
2019 deaths
Lawyers from Los Angeles
Male actors from Los Angeles
American male child actors
California State University, Northridge alumni
University of West Los Angeles alumni
Deaths from cancer in California
20th-century American lawyers